Belfast is a cover album by folk metal artists Mägo de Oz, which was released in 2004.

Track listing
 "Irish Pub" (cover of Gwendal) - 3:00
 "Belfast" (cover of Boney M.) - 4:53
 "La Rosa de los Vientos" (metal version of The Compass Rose) - 6:20
 "Dame tu Amor"(cover of Whitesnake's "Guilty of Love") (Give me your love) - 3:25
 "Mujer Amante" (cover of Rata Blanca) (Lover Woman) - 7:03
 "Alma" (orchestral version) (Soul) - 6:49
 "Más que una Intención" (cover of Asfalto) (More than an intention) - 7:18
 "Dama Negra" (cover of Uriah Heep's "Lady in Black") - 5:03
 "Todo Irá Bien" (cover of Elvis Presley's "Can't Help Falling in Love") (Everything will be ok) - 5:19
 "Se Acabó" (cover of Leño) (This is the end) - 2:53
 "Hasta que tu Muerte nos Separe" (orchestral version) (Till your death do us part) - 5:32
 "Somewhere Over the Rainbow" (cover of Israel Kamakawiwo'ole) - 4:37

DVD
 "La rosa de los vientos" (video)
 "Entrevista - Photo Gallery"

All tracks written by Mägo de Oz except when noted.

Members
Mägo de Oz
Víctor García - Additional vocals on La Rosa De Los Vientos (guest)

2004 albums
Mägo de Oz albums
Locomotive Music albums